Catocala optima, the Turanga underwing, is a moth of the family Erebidae. The species was first described by Otto Staudinger in 1888. It is found in Xinjiang, China.

The wingspan is 44–46 mm.

References

Moths described in 1888
optima
Moths of Asia